Jeanne Royannez, also known as Madame Clovis Hugues (1855-1932) was a French sculptor.

Biography
Hugues-Royannez was born on 5 November 1855 in Paris. She studied with Laure Coutan-Montorgueil. In 1877 she married the socialist journalist Clovis Hugues (1851-1907) with whom she had two daughters. She first exhibited at the Paris Salon in 1886. Hugues-Royannez exhibited her work in the Woman's Building at the 1893 World's Columbian Exposition in Chicago, Illinois.

She died on 6 May 1932 in Paris.

Gallery

References

External links
 

1855 births
1932 deaths
19th-century French women artists
20th-century French women artists
19th-century French sculptors
20th-century French sculptors